K-6 is an intercontinental submarine-launched ballistic missile under development by Defence Research and Development Organisation of India. The missile has a planned range of around 10,000 to 13,000 kilometres.

Requirement 
Admiral Arun Prakash wrote in 2018 that the missile range of the Arihant-class submarines is not sufficient to target potential adversaries of India; a missile with a range of around 6,000-8,000 kilometres would be required for this task to be performed by a submarine patrolling in a "safe haven".

When the missile payload limitations of the Arihant-class were realised, India began developing the S5-class of submarines and the K-6 ballistic missiles. The developmental work for these missiles started in February 2017 at the Advanced Naval Systems Laboratory of   DRDO, with a completion target of less than ten years.

Description 
The K-6 is an intercontinental submarine-launched ballistic missile. It is a three-stage missile and is solid fuelled. It is planned to armed with multiple independently targetable reentry vehicles and will have a range of around 6,000 to 8,000 kilometres with a three-tonne payload. It has a planned length of over 12 metres and a diameter of over 2 metres.

Development 
The K-6 is being developed by the Advanced Naval Systems Laboratory of the Defence Research and Development Organisation since 2017.  Testing of the K-5 missile will assist in developing the K-6.

See also 

 K Missile family
 S5-class submarine
 India and weapons of mass destruction

References 

Submarine-launched ballistic missiles
Defence Research and Development Organisation
Ballistic missiles of India
Nuclear weapons programme of India
Nuclear missiles of India